Miami Mafia may refer to several organized crime groups operating in Miami, Florida, and the Miami metropolitan area, especially Italian-American Mafia criminal organizations. Criminal organizations known to operate in Miami include:

 Trafficante crime family, the only Italian-American Mafia crime family originating in Florida, though mainly operating in the Tampa Bay area
Various Italian-American Mafia families that originate outside of Florida but operate in Miami, including:
Bonanno crime family
Colombo crime family
Gambino crime family
Genovese crime family
Lucchese crime family
Philadelphia crime family
Chicago Outfit
New Orleans crime family
Sicilian Mafia
Jewish Mob
Camorra
'Ndrangheta
The Corporation (Cuban Mafia)
Dixie Mafia

References

Gangs in Florida
American Mafia crews
Italian-American culture in Florida